Richard Penn may refer to:

 Richard Penn Sr. (1706–1771), younger son of William Penn and joint proprietor of Pennsylvania
 Richard Penn (governor) (c. 1735–1811), his son, Lieutenant Governor of Pennsylvania, 1771–1773, and British Member of Parliament
 Richard Penn (FRS) (1784–1863), Member of Parliament and Fellow of the Royal Society

See also
 Dick Penn, English cricketer